Constituency WR-10 is a reserved seat for women in the Khyber Pakhtunkhwa Assembly.

See also
 Constituency PK-89 (Chitral-I)
 Constituency PK-90 (Chitral-II)

References

Khyber Pakhtunkhwa Assembly constituencies